The 2020–21 Champions Hockey League was scheduled to be the seventh season of the Champions Hockey League, a European ice hockey tournament. The tournament was planned to be competed by 32 teams, with qualification being on sporting merits only. The six founding leagues would have been represented by between three and five teams (based on a three-year league ranking), while seven "challenge leagues" were to be represented by one team each. An additional spot would have been awarded to the 2019–20 IIHF Continental Cup winner.
Because of the COVID-19 pandemic, a revised schedule was presented that would have seen the season start directly with a 32-team play-off in October. However, because the situation did not improve sufficiently in Europe, it was announced in early October that the CHL board of directors had cancelled the tournament, without any games being played.

Team allocation
A total of 32 teams from different European first-tier leagues would have participated in the 2020–21 Champions Hockey League. Besides the Continental Cup champions, 24 teams from the six founding leagues, as well as the national champions from Slovakia, Norway, Denmark, France, Belarus, Great Britain and Poland could have qualified.

The qualification for these places is set out in the rules as follows:

 CHL champions
 National league champions (play-off winners)
 Regular season winners
 Regular season runners-up
 Regular season third-placed team
 Regular season fourth-placed team
 Regular season fifth-placed team

For the Austrian Hockey League teams are however picked in this order:
 League champions
 Regular season winners
 Pick Round winners
 Pick Round runners-up
 Losing playoff finalists

Note: Great Britain is the lone exception as the EIHL, in line with their traditions, determine their national champion following the regular season (not in the playoffs).

Due to the COVID-19 pandemic in Europe, many leagues were forced to cancel their seasons early. Places usually reserved for the playoff champions of those leagues were given to the next best team from the regular season, or in the Austrian Hockey League's case, the next best team from the regular season pick round. In the case of the Elite Ice Hockey League, the team leading the regular season at the time of its cancellation were given its Champions Hockey League place. HC '05 Banská Bystrica qualified for the CHL as Slovak Tipsport liga's regular season champion but had to withdraw due to issues related to the arena. They were replaced by HC Neman Grodno.

On 15 September, the CHL announced that the Cardiff Devils had withdrawn from the league due to the suspension of the 2020–21 EIHL season. No new team would replace them.

Teams

References

2020
Champions
Ice hockey events cancelled due to the COVID-19 pandemic